The Japan America Society of Houston is an educational society established in Houston, Texas on May 19, 1968.
its mission is "To bring the people of the United States and Japan closer together in appreciation and understanding of each other".
It does this through film screenings, lectures, symposia, cultural lectures, and workshops.

1968 establishments in Texas
Japan–United States relations